James A. Smith was the first mayor of Ridgefield, Washington, which incorporated in 1909.

References

People from Ridgefield, Washington
Mayors of places in Washington (state)
Year of birth missing
Year of death missing